Charles Armijo Woodruff (January 12, 1884 – November 23, 1945) was a United States Navy officer and the governor of American Samoa from December 6, 1914, to March 1, 1915. He captained multiple ships in both the Navy and the United States Merchant Marine. He served only briefly as governor, for a few months before ceding the office to John Martin Poyer.

Life
Woodruff was born on January 12, 1884, in Santa Fe, New Mexico, the son of Charles Woodruff and Louise (Duff) Woodruff. After leaving the United States Navy, Woodruff became a part of the United States Merchant Marine, captaining a ship. On November 23, 1945, Woodruff die by suicide by hanging in an apartment in Hotel Bossert, Brooklyn, New York City, using the venetian blinds cord in his room. A suicide note claimed he had killed himself because he had no means of making money and "missed his boat", and that suicide provided the "easiest way out".

Naval career
Woodruff was appointed to the United States Naval Academy from Pennsylvania on September 24, 1902. In 1906, he commanded the USS Pampanga (PG-39) as a Lieutenant (junior grade). Woodruff retired from the Navy with the rank of Commander.

Governorship
Woodruff relieved Nathan Post of the governor's office on December 6, 1914, serving until March 1, 1915.

References

1884 births
1945 deaths
Governors of American Samoa
United States Naval Academy alumni
Suicides by hanging in New York City
United States Merchant Mariners
United States Navy officers
Politicians from Santa Fe, New Mexico
Military personnel from New Mexico
American politicians who committed suicide
American military personnel who committed suicide
Suicides in New York City